Jago temple (Indonesian: Candi Jago) is a 13th-century Hindu temple from the Singhasari kingdom in East Java, Indonesia, located about 22 km from Malang. The Nagarakretagama written in 14th century mentioned this temple, as Jajaghu (English: "majestic"), as one of the temples visited by King Hayam Wuruk during his royal tour across East Java.
 
The Singhasari King Vishnuvardhana was deified as Shiva, in the form of Bodhisattva Avalokitesvara, here after his death in 1268.  The temple's bas-reliefs depict scenes from the Kunjarakarna, Parthayajna, Arjunavivaha, and Krishnayana.

The name of Adityawarman appears in 1343 on an image of the Bodhisattva Manjusri.

See also

 Candi of Indonesia
 Hinduism in Java
 Indonesian Esoteric Buddhism
 Jawi Temple
 Singhasari temple

References

Archaeological sites in Indonesia
Buildings and structures in East Java
Singhasari
13th-century Hindu temples
Cultural Properties of Indonesia in East Java